Fritz Feld (October 15, 1900 – November 18, 1993) was a German-American film character actor who appeared in over 140 films in 72 years, both silent and sound. His trademark was to slap his mouth with the palm of his hand to create a "pop" sound.

Early life and career

Born in Berlin, Germany, Feld began his acting career in Germany in 1917, making his screen debut in Der Golem und die Tänzerin (The Golem and the Dancing Girl). Feld filmed the sound sequences of the Cecil B. DeMille film The Godless Girl (1929), released by Pathé, without DeMille's supervision since DeMille had already broken his contract with Pathé, and signed with Metro-Goldwyn-Mayer.

He developed a characterization that came to define him. His trademark was to slap his mouth with the palm of his hand to create a "pop!" sound that indicated both his superiority and his annoyance. The first use of the "pop" sound was in If You Knew Susie (1948).

Feld often played the part of a maître d', but also a variety of aristocrats and eccentrics. In the 1938 screwball comedy Bringing Up Baby he played the role of Dr. Lehman. In 1939 he appeared with the Marx Brothers in At The Circus in the small role of French orchestra conductor Jardinet. In his later years, Feld appeared in several Walt Disney films and also played an uncharacteristically dramatic role in Barfly. He also portrayed one of the Harmonia Gardens waiters in the movie Hello Dolly! (1969). In addition to films, he acted in numerous television series in guest roles, including the recurring role of Zumdish, the manager of the intergalactic Celestial Department Store on Lost In Space, in two Season 2 episodes, "The Android Machine" and "The Toymaker". Zumdish returned in the Season 3 episode "Two Weeks In Space". In one 1967 episode of The Man from U.N.C.L.E., "The Napoleon's Tomb Affair", Feld played a banker, a beatnik, a diplomat and a waiter.

Feld made his final film appearance in 1989.

Personal life

Feld was married to Virginia Christine who was twenty years his junior and famous for her role as "Mrs. Olson" in television commercials for Folgers Coffee, from 1940 until his death in 1993 in a convalescent home in Los Angeles, California; Christine died in 1996. The couple are interred at the Jewish Mount Sinai Memorial Park Cemetery in the Hollywood Hills section of Los Angeles.

He was the younger brother of the art director Rudi Feld. 

Feld was a strong enough amateur chess player that 1948 U.S. champion Herman Steiner and international master George Koltanowski would come to his home some evenings in the 1940s, with the three of them playing chess until 6 o'clock the following morning, as mentioned in The Bobby Fischer I Knew and Other Stories (Denker & Parr, 1995).

Partial filmography

The Golem and the Dancing Girl (1917) as Hotel Page
Dämon der Welt. 1. Das Schicksal des Edgar Morton (1919)
The Golem: How He Came into the World (1920) as Jester (uncredited)
 Christian Wahnschaffe (1920)
A Ship Comes In (1928) as Sokol
The Last Command (1928) as A Revolutionist
Blindfold (1928) as Thomas Bernard
Broadway (1929) as Mose Levett
Black Magic (1929) as James Fraser
One Hysterical Night (1929) as Paganini
I Met Him in Paris (1937) as Swiss Hotel Clerk
Lancer Spy (1937) as Fritz Mueller
Expensive Husbands (1937) as Herr Meyer, Hotel Director
Hollywood Hotel (1937) as The Russian
True Confession (1937) as Krayler's Butler
Tovarich (1937) as Martelleau, neighbor
Annabel Takes a Tour (1938)
Bringing Up Baby (1938) as Dr. Lehman
Romance in the Dark (1938) as Fritz
Go Chase Yourself (1938) as Count Pierre Fountaine de Louis-Louis
Gold Diggers in Paris (1938) as Luis Leoni
I'll Give a Million (1938) as Max Primerose
The Affairs of Annabel (1938) as Vladimir
Campus Confessions (1938) as 'Lady MacBeth'
Artists and Models Abroad (1938) as Dubois
Swingtime in the Movies (1938, Short) as Mr. Nitvitch
Idiot's Delight (1939) as Pittatek
When Tomorrow Comes (1939) as Nicholas
At the Circus (1939) as Jardinet
Little Accident (1939) as Malisse
Everything Happens at Night (1939) as Gendarme
Little Old New York (1940) as Tavern Keeper
Millionaire Playboy (1940) as 'G.G.' Gorta
Ma! He's Making Eyes at Me (film) (1940) as Forsythe
It's a Date (1940) as Headwaiter
I Was an Adventuress (1940) as Henri Gautier
Sandy Is a Lady (1940) as Mario
Victory (1940) as Signor Makanoff
Come Live with Me (1941) as Mac, the Headwaiter (uncredited)
Three Sons o' Guns (1941) as Blotievkin
World Premiere (1941) as Field Marshal Muller
You Belong to Me (1941) as hotel desk clerk
Skylark (1941) as Maitre d'Hotel (uncredited)
The Mexican Spitfire's Baby (1941) as Lt. Pierre Gaston de la Blanc
Four Jacks and a Jill (1942) as Mr. Hoople
Shut My Big Mouth (1942) as Robert Oglethorpe
Sleepytime Gal (1942) as Chef Petrovich
Maisie Gets Her Man (1942) as Professor Orco
Iceland (1942) as Herr Tegnar
Henry Aldrich Swings It (1943) as Josef Altman
Phantom of the Opera (1943) as Lecours
Holy Matrimony (1943) as Critic
Passport to Destiny (1944) as Chief Janitor
Knickerbocker Holiday (1944) as Poffenburgh
Take It Big (1944) as Doctor Dittenhoffer
Ever Since Venus (1944) as Michele
The Great John L. (1945) as Claire's Manager
George White's Scandals (1945) as Montescu
Captain Tugboat Annie (1945) as Al Pucci aka Alfred Puccini
The Catman of Paris (1946) as Prefect of Police
The Wife of Monte Cristo (1946) as Bonnett
Her Sister's Secret (1946) as New Orleans Wine Salesman
Gentleman Joe Palooka (1946) as Club Steward
I've Always Loved You (1946) as Nicholas Kavlun
Carnival in Costa Rica (1947) as Hotel Clerk
Fun on a Weekend (1947) as Sergei Stroganoff
The Secret Life of Walter Mitty (1947) as Anatole
If You Knew Susie (1948) as Chez Henri
My Girl Tisa (1948) as Prof. Tabor
The Noose Hangs High (1948) as Psychiatrist
Julia Misbehaves (1948) as Pepito
You Gotta Stay Happy (1948) as Pierre
Trouble Makers (1948) as Mr. Andre Schmidtlap – Hotel Manager
Mexican Hayride (1948) as Professor Ganzmeyer
The Lovable Cheat (1949) as Monsieur Louis
The Great Lover (1949) as Waiter (uncredited)
Belle of Old Mexico (1950) as Dr. Quincy
Appointment with Danger (1950) as Window Dresser (uncredited)
Riding High (1950) as French Dressmaker (uncredited)
The Jackpot (1950) as Long-Haired Pianist (uncredited)
Rhythm Inn (1951) as Prof. Rinaldo
Missing Women (1951) as Pierre
Kentucky Jubilee (1951) as Rudolph 'Rudi' Jouvet
Little Egypt (1951) as Professor
Journey Into Light (1951) as Clothing Salesman
Sky High (1951) as Dr. Kapok
My Favorite Spy (1951) as Dress Designer (uncredited)
Aaron Slick from Punkin Crick (1952) as Headwaiter
Has Anybody Seen My Gal? (1952) as Alvarez (uncredited)
O. Henry's Full House (1952) as Maurice (segment "The Gift of the Magi") (uncredited)
Call Me Madam (1953) as Hat Clerk (uncredited)
Crime Wave (1953) as Jess (uncredited)
The French Line (1953) as Last Cab Driver (uncredited)
Paris Playboys (1954) as Marcel, Maitre d'
Riding Shotgun (1954) as Fritz
Casanova's Big Night (1954) as Baron Mittschalk of Cardovia (uncredited)
Living It Up (1954) as The Barber (uncredited)
Jail Busters (1955) as Dr. Fernando F. Fordyce (uncredited)
Up in Smoke (1957) as Dr. Bluzak
Juke Box Rhythm (1959) as Ambrose
Don't Give Up the Ship (1959) as Room Service Waiter (uncredited)
The Miracle of the White Reindeer (1960) as Geronimo
The Ladies Man (1961) as Mrs. Wellenmellon's Hairdresser (uncredited)
The Errand Boy (1961) as Busby – Roaring 20's Director
Pocketful of Miracles (1961) as Pierre
Promises! Promises! (1963) as Ship's Doctor
Who's Minding the Store? (1963) as Irving Cahastrophe, the Gourmet Manager
4 for Texas (1963) as Fritz
The Patsy (1964) as Maitre D' (uncredited)
Harlow (1965) as Fritz—Window Washer in Movie (uncredited)
Made in Paris (1966) as Josef – Night Watchman (uncredited)
Three on a Couch (1966) as The Attaché
Way... Way Out (1966) as Breckinridge, the Maitre d' (uncredited)
Penelope (1966) as Penelope's Dance Partner (uncredited)
Caprice (1967) as Swiss Innkeeper (uncredited)
Barefoot in the Park (1967) as Restaurant Proprietor
The Wicked Dreams of Paula Schultz (1968) as Kessel
The Comic (1969) as Armand
Hello, Dolly! (1969) as Rudolph's Assistant
The Computer Wore Tennis Shoes (1969) as Sigmund Van Dyke
The Phynx (1970) as Fritz Feld
Which Way to the Front? (1970) as Von Runstadt (uncredited)
Herbie Rides Again (1974) as Maître d'
The Strongest Man in the World (1975) as Uncle Frederick
The Sunshine Boys (1975) as Mr. Gilbert, Man at Audition
Won Ton Ton, the Dog Who Saved Hollywood (1976) as Rudy's Butler
Silent Movie (1976) as Maitre d' 
Freaky Friday (1976) as Mr. Jackman
The World's Greatest Lover (1977) as Tomaso Abalone
Legend of the Northwest (1978) as Trapper
Herbie Goes Bananas (1980) as Chief Steward
History of the World, Part I (1981) as Maitre 'D (The Roman Empire)
Heidi's Song (1982) as Sebastian (voice)
Barfly (1987) as Bum
Homer and Eddie (1989) as Mortician (final film role)

References

Further reading

External links

1900 births
1993 deaths
German male film actors
German male silent film actors
German emigrants to the United States
Burials at Mount Sinai Memorial Park Cemetery
Male actors from Berlin
Jewish American male actors
People from Greater Los Angeles
20th-century German male actors
American people of German-Jewish descent
20th-century American Jews